Adrian White is an Anglo-Irish writer. A native of Manchester, United Kingdom, White wrote his first novel when aged twenty-one. He graduated from the University of Manchester with a BA in Art history. White moved to Galway City in 1990 to work for Eason's booksellers.

Bibliography
 An Accident Waiting to Happen’, Penguin Books, 2004
 Where the Rain Gets In, Penguin Books, 2006
 Dancing to the End of Love, self-published, 2011

References

External links
 http://www.galwayindependent.com/profiles/profiles/adrian-white-%11-author/
 https://web.archive.org/web/20111220141336/http://www.rte.ie/ten/2004/0630/whitea.html

English writers
Irish writers
Writers from Manchester
People from County Galway
Living people
Year of birth missing (living people)